Adolf Ludvig Gustav Fredrik Albert Badin (né Couchi; 1747 or 1750 – 1822), known as Badin, was a Swedish court servant (Kammermohr) and diarist. Originally a slave, he was the foster son and servant of Queen Louisa Ulrika of Sweden and a servant to his foster sister Princess Sophia Albertine of Sweden. His original name was Couchi, but he was commonly known as Badin ('mischief-maker' or 'trickster').

Early life

Badin was born either in Africa or in the Danish island Saint Croix. He himself said that the only thing he remembered about his past was his parents' hut burning, but it is not known whether this happened in Africa or in Saint Croix. It is known that he lived in Saint Croix during his childhood. 

He was taken to Europe, probably on a Danish East Indies ship, from where he was bought by a Danish captain, who gave him to statesman Anders von Resier sv, who, in turn, gave him as a present to the Queen of Sweden, Louisa Ulrika of Prussia, in 1757. 

The date of his birth is not really known. 1747 is a traditional year of his birth, but within the court and the Timmerman Order, the year was registered as 1750, and this is considered more correct by modern historians.

Upbringing at court

The queen decided to make him an experiment in upbringing; she was interested in science and had founded a science academy, the Royal Swedish Academy of Letters, History and Antiquities, where, among other topics, the origin of man and civilisation was discussed, such as the nature of "savages", the noble savage and the natural human, and in Badin, she saw an opportunity to test the theories of Rousseau and Linné. She instructed him in Christianity and taught him to read and write, but after this, he was allowed to live entirely according to his own will and judgement. 

He grew up as a playmate of the children in the royal family, who were brought up in a much more restricted way than he was, and was allowed to speak to them in a natural way and even fight and tease them, which was considered scandalous. He knew all the secret passages within the royal castles and, as it was said, all the secrets within its walls. Contemporary diaries describe how he climbed on the chairs of the king and queen, called everyone "you" instead of using their titles, talked rudely to the nobility and ridiculed religion when interrogated about the bible by Countess Brahe, which made everyone laugh; he was very witty and verbal.

The relationship with his royal foster-siblings was in general described as good, no matter that he called King Gustav "Gustav the Willen" and Duke Charles "Mr Tobacco". He was close to his foster-sister, Princess Sophia Albertina, and wrote a poem for her on her birthday (1764):
"I, one of the Black PeopleUnfamiliar with this country's customsMake a wish from my heartTo our Princess too."

Court life in adulthood

On 11 December 1768, he was baptised in the chapel of Drottningholm Palace with the entire royal family, except Prince Charles, as his godparents. 

He was described as an intelligent and reliable person with self-confidence, and though he was informed about many of the secrets of the royal family and the court, he never revealed anything, and was very loyal to the royal house throughout his entire life.

Badin sometimes helped the court poet Bellman to compose verses for special occasions, and some of them were published in his name. Badin participated in plays at the French Theatre in Bollhuset; he is listed as a dancer in a ballet in the 1769–70 season and played the main part in Arlequin Sauvage in the 1770–71 season, a play in which a "savage" meets civilization, and an erotic play by Marivaux.

In 1782, when the queen lay on her death-bed in her country residence, she sent Badin to Stockholm with the key to her files. After her death, Badin acquired the files and handed them in the custody of prince Fredrick Adolf and princess Sophia Albertina, who burnt them.   The young king, Gustav III of Sweden, became enraged. They had an argument and the king said; "Do you not know, you black person, that such things may cost your head?" He replied: "My head is in the power of your Majesty, but I could not act in a different way."

Private life

The social position of Badin is not quite clear. When his foster mother queen dowager Louisa Ulrika died in 1782, he and his foster sister princess Sophia Albertina were no longer the wards of the queen dowager and her household, but now under the responsibility of the king, Gustav III himself. After the death of Queen Louisa Ulrika, Badin was given three farmhouses outside Stockholm by the Swedish king, which gave him an income and some financial security. He was also given several honorary titles such as chamberlain, court secretary, ballet master and Assessor (a judge's or magistrate's assistant). Despite having the honorary title Assessor, which gave him the right to refer to himself as an official, he refused and replied to the king: "Have you ever seen a black assessor?" Instead preferred to call himself farmer, referring to the two farms he owned. 

Badin was married twice but died childless. The rumors that he was the father of the alleged secret daughter of Sophia Albertina have never been confirmed. He married the grocer's daughter Elisabet Swart (d. 1798) in 1782, and the ship carpenter's daughter Magdalena Eleonora Norell (1779–c.1840) in 1799.  He did have a child with his first wife, but the child died in infancy in 1784, and no other children are noted. He and his second wife are however noted to have had a foster daughter named Christina living with them. 

He was elected to the orders of Par Bricole, Svea Orden sv, Timmermansorden sv and the Freemasons.

During his later life, he was reportedly supported financially by princess Sophia Albertina.  His home is described as neither rich nor poor but comfortable, and he and his wife are noted to have been generous and often having guests, notably his wife's relatives, living with them. They shared their time between their home in Stockholm and their two farms in Uppland, when Badin gradually spent less and less time at court. 

Badin collected an extensive library consisting of some 900 volumes, mostly in French. It was sold in Stockholm in the year of his death 1822 with a printed catalogue. This makes him one of the first recorded book collectors of African origin.

Context 

Badin was not the only African brought to Sweden during the 18th century; in the churches of Stockholm, other "morians" (which was a name for black people) were baptised, such as Johannes in 1757, Adolf Ulrik in 1759 and Zamore (also a court servant) in 1772, Vulcain in the Royal Chapel in Stockholm in 1776 and a woman, Daphne, in Småland in 1783. Duke Charles bought "the most beautiful morian Sweden has ever seen" according to Gjörwell in 1771. Also, non-black converts are recorded, such as Pluto from India in 1785 and Native Americans in the presence of nobility and a large gathering of the people.

Legacy

Badin is a character in the novel Morianen by Magnus Jacob Crusenstolpe in 1838, where he was described as the participator in all the secrets and greater events of the royal family, from the revolution of 1772 to the deposition of 1809.  Though this was exaggerated, it was nevertheless a more-or-less true image of him.

His diaries, written in French, are preserved in the library of the Uppsala University.

See also
 John Panzio
  Jean Amilcar

Notes

References
 Svenskt biografiskt handlexikon 
 Nordisk familjebok 
 Andersson, Ingvar (red.), Gustavianskt: [1771-1810] : en bokfilm, [Ny utg.], Wahlström & Widstrand, Stockholm, 1979
 Signum svenska kulturhistoria: Frihetstiden (The age of liberty) 
 Svenska män och kvinnor (Swedish men and women. Dictionary) 
 Anna Ivarsdotter Johnsson och Leif Jonsson: "Musiken i Sverige. Frihetstiden och Gustaviansk tid 1720-1810."  (Music in Sweden. The age of liberty and the Gustavian age) 
 Gidlunds förlag: "Ny svensk teaterhistoria. Teater före 1800" (New Swedish theatre history. Theatre before 1800)

Literature
 Eric Basir: "Badin's Diary: An English Translation."
 Eric Basir: "Badin and the Secret of the Saami."
 Arvid Bergman:"Född slav-Död fri? ". 2018. Stockholmia publishing print.

Swedish slaves
1740s births
1822 deaths
Swedish diarists
18th-century Swedish people
Year of birth uncertain
19th-century Swedish people
Swedish courtiers
Age of Liberty people
Gustavian era people
Swedish people of African descent
18th-century slaves
Court of Gustav III
18th-century diarists